The 1992–93 Long Beach State 49ers men's basketball team represented California State University, Long Beach during the 1992–93 NCAA Division I men's basketball season. The 49ers, led by fifth year head coach Seth Greenberg, played their home games at Walter Pyramid and are members of the Big West Conference.  They finished the season 22–10, 11–7 in Big West play to finish in fourth place. They were champions of the Big West Basketball tournament to earn the conference's automatic bid into the 1993 NCAA tournament where they lost in the opening round to No. 6 seed Illinois, 75–72.

Roster

Schedule and results

|-
!colspan=9 style=| Non-Conference Regular season

|-
!colspan=9 style=| Big West Regular season

|-
!colspan=9 style=| 1993 Big West tournament

|-
!colspan=9 style=| 1993 NCAA tournament

References

Long Beach State Beach men's basketball seasons
Long Beach
Long Beach